The Ongarue River is a river of the Waikato and Manawatū-Whanganui regions of New Zealand's North Island. A major tributary of the Whanganui River, it flows west then south from its sources in the Hauhungaroa Range northwest of Lake Taupo, passing through the town of Taumarunui before reaching the Whanganui River.

Tributaries of the Ongarue include the Maramataha River and the Mangakahu River

See also
List of rivers of New Zealand

References

Rivers of Waikato
Rivers of Manawatū-Whanganui
Rivers of New Zealand